Lenophyllum is a genus of flowering plants in the family Crassulaceae. The roughly seven species it contains are distributed in Texas in the United States and northeastern Mexico. Some authorities place it in the genus Sedum. Plants in this genus are distinguished from Sedum species by the presence of terminal inflorescences, erect petals, and opposite leaves. The name is derived from the Ancient Greek words ληνός (lenos), meaning "trough", and φύλλον (phyllon), meaning "leaf."

Selected species
 Lenophyllum acutifolium Rose
 Lenophyllum guttatum Rose
 Lenophyllum texanum (J.G.Sm.) Rose – Coastal stonecrop
 Lenophyllum weinbergii Britton

References

External links

Crassulaceae
Crassulaceae genera
Succulent plants